David Holt (born March 10, 1979) is an American attorney, businessman and Republican politician who is the 38th mayor of Oklahoma City. He is a member of the Osage Nation. He is the youngest mayor of Oklahoma City since 1923; during his first year in office, he was the youngest mayor of a U.S. city over 500,000. He is Oklahoma City's first Native American mayor. His signature achievement as mayor has been the passage of MAPS 4 in 2019, a $1.1 billion initiative including 16 projects, which voters approved in a landslide. He served in the Oklahoma Senate from 2010 to 2018, eventually as majority whip. In 2021, Punchbowl News called Holt "a whip-smart technocratic Republican who seems out of step with the party's current slash-and-burn mentality."

Holt was elected mayor on February 13, 2018, and sworn in on April 10. He was reelected on February 8, 2022. Holt is also the author of Big League City: Oklahoma City's Rise to the NBA (2012). In 2014, Chuck Todd of NBC News named him a "Rising Star" in politics.

Early life and education
Holt was born and raised in northwest Oklahoma City, with family roots in Pittsburg County, Oklahoma. He is Osage through his mother, Mary Ann Fuller Holt, who inspired him to public service. He was also inspired by his maternal grandfather, Leonard Fuller, a World War II veteran and career Army officer who directed the Model Cities Program in McAlester, Oklahoma, after his retirement from the military.

After graduating from Putnam City North High School in Oklahoma City, Holt earned a B.A. from George Washington University, which his mother attended. He served as a sports editor for The GW Hatchet. 
 
Holt returned to Oklahoma, where he earned a Juris Doctor from Oklahoma City University and established a legal practice. In 2014, he was named director of investor relations for Hall Capital. He has also served as an adjunct professor at Oklahoma City University.

Career
Holt became active in the Republican Party, serving as an aide to Dennis Hastert when Hastert was Speaker of the House, and during the 9/11 attacks. He served in the White House Office of Legislative Affairs under President George W. Bush. 
 
In 2004, Holt returned full-time to Oklahoma, where he served as the state's campaign coordinator to reelect Bush. He served U.S. Senator Jim Inhofe and Lt. Governor Mary Fallin. In 2006 he was appointed chief of staff to Oklahoma City Mayor Mick Cornett, where he served until his election to the State Senate. Holt was Cornett's chief of staff when Oklahoma City successfully lobbied to attract a major league basketball team, gaining what is now known as the Oklahoma City Thunder of the National Basketball Association.

State senate

Holt was elected to the State Senate on July 27, 2010, taking 64% of the vote in the Republican primary and running unopposed in the general election. He took office on November 16, 2010. He succeeded Glenn Coffee, the first Republican Senate president pro tempore in Oklahoma history.

On his first day of office in November 2010, Holt was elected to the Senate leadership as majority caucus vice chair. He was also named vice chair of the Senate Business & Commerce Committee and vice chair of the Senate Redistricting Committee. His first session as a senator was notable for his efforts to lower the Oklahoma income tax, and his efforts to ensure that local taxpayers have control over their tax dollars. In his first session, a local weekly publication named Holt "Most Shining Legislator". Later that year, he was credited with branding Route 66 where it passes through Oklahoma City, to define it as a tourist destination.

In 2012, Holt's second session, he was noted for being the primary author of a bill to eliminate Oklahoma's income tax. He also authored legislation to bring unprecedented transparency to the Oklahoma legislature. The Oklahoma Republican Party named Holt one of Oklahoma's seven Republican members of the Electoral College for the upcoming presidential election. In late 2012, Holt was credited with instigating Oklahoma's first state recognition of Hanukkah.

For the 2013-14 legislative sessions, Holt was elected majority whip for the Senate Republican caucus. He was also named vice chair of the new Appropriations Subcommittee on Select Agencies. Holt introduced a "parent trigger" law for Oklahoma in the 2013 legislative session, which would authorize parents to take stronger roles in trying to improve underachieving schools. A similar law was depicted in the film Won't Back Down. In 2013, Holt authored legislation that legalized "Black Friday" and other low-price sales in the state of Oklahoma. He spearheaded an effort to honor writer Ralph Ellison with a portrait in the Oklahoma Capitol.

In 2014, Holt was named to the national Legislative Leaders Advisory Board of GOPAC. Chuck Todd of NBC News, reporting on the politics of all 50 states, named Holt one of two Republican "Rising Stars" in Oklahoma. He was reelected to a second term unopposed. That year Holt received a number of awards from nonprofits and interest groups, including:

"Legislative Champion" award from the National Multiple Sclerosis Society
"Sunshine Award" from Freedom of Information Oklahoma, for demonstrating a commitment to transparency in government
"Guardian Award" from the Oklahoma Commission on the Status of Women for his work on behalf of women and children
"Child Abuse Prevention Leadership Award" from Parent Promise

For the 2015 and 2016 sessions, Holt was named chairman of the Appropriations Subcommittee on Select Agencies. In January 2015, he introduced a comprehensive election reform package intended to boost voter turnout. He gained passage of a law to authorize online voter registration in the state. Other bills not adopted included proposals by Holt to shift Oklahoma to a "top two" primary system and institute all-mail voting. In 2015, he authored legislation to allow Oklahoma City and Tulsa to authorize charter schools. Holt received the "Bulldog Award" from the Oklahoma District Attorneys Council for his work on addressing videos taken from body cameras so that police departments would adopt their widespread use. Holt was a featured speaker at the Southern Republican Leadership Conference in May 2015, an event that featured most of the leading presidential candidates. In September 2015, presidential candidate Marco Rubio named Holt his Oklahoma campaign chair.

In 2016, Holt introduced a "sweeping proposal" to increase Oklahoma teacher pay by $10,000 to bring it in line with the national average. He helped spearhead a successful effort to secure an American Ninja Warrior shoot at the Oklahoma Capitol. Holt authored legislation to create a "revenue stabilization fund" intended to minimize the effect of future revenue shortfalls. He received a Governor's Arts Award.

In the 2017 and 2018 sessions, Holt was named Appropriations Subcommittee Chair for Public Safety and Judiciary. He also introduced a comprehensive plan to increase teacher pay in Oklahoma by $10,000 again. He became one of the deciding votes delivering Oklahoma teachers their largest raise in state history. Holt also carried successful legislation to allow Oklahoma flyers to use a driver's license to fly, as well as legislation to extend the statute of limitations for child sexual abuse. He was unsuccessful in his efforts to extend family leave for state employees.

Mayor of Oklahoma City (first term)

In 2017, Holt was named "OKCityan of the Year". In 2018, he announced his candidacy for mayor of Oklahoma City.

Holt was elected mayor on February 13, 2018, defeating Taylor Neighbors and Randall Smith in a nonpartisan race. Numerous prominent elected Republicans and Democrats endorsed him, including four Oklahoma governors of both parties. Holt was sworn in as mayor on April 10. He asked Willa Johnson, the first female African American member of the Oklahoma City Council, to administer his oath of office. That day, he relocated the pictures of former mayors from the mayoral conference room and replaced them with pictures of Oklahoma City kids representing the city's demographics among young people, who he said were 60% nonwhite. He resigned from the state senate before taking office. At the time of his swearing-in, Holt was 39 years and one month old, making him Oklahoma City's youngest mayor since 1923 and the youngest mayor of a U.S. city over 500,000, as well as Oklahoma City's first Native American mayor. Carrying a unifying message of "One OKC", Holt's stated priorities upon taking office were to upgrade core services, continue improvements in quality of life, improve public education, and incorporate the diversity of the city into decision-making.

In 2019, Holt and city leaders opened the city's new streetcar system, a project funded by MAPS 3.

Holt's second year in office brought the development and passage of MAPS 4, a $1.1 billion initiative to address 16 priorities. The Oklahoman called Holt "the architect" of the "most ambitious MAPS ever". The initiative received 71.7% of the vote on December 10, 2019, a modern record for a sales tax vote in Oklahoma City. MAPS 4 includes funding for a civil rights center, parks, youth centers, senior centers, mental health and addiction, a family justice center for victims of domestic violence, transit including new bus rapid transit lines, sidewalks, bike lanes, trails, streetlights, housing to alleviate homelessness, Chesapeake Arena, an animal shelter, a new fairgrounds coliseum, a diversion hub to assist people interacting with the criminal justice system, the Innovation District, beautification and a multipurpose stadium.

In 2018, Holt received the Ten Outstanding Young Americans award. In 2019, he was elected to the leadership of the United States Conference of Mayors and named vice-chair of the International Affairs Committee. In 2020, Holt was elected a trustee of the United States Conference of Mayors, the organization's highest level of leadership. and to the board of the National League of Cities.

In 2019, Holt organized a free Kings of Leon concert to open the city's Scissortail Park. It drew 28,000 people, the largest crowd at a music concert in Oklahoma City history. In 2020, Holt was named the third-most powerful person in Oklahoma and the most powerful non-tribal elected official in a local annual ranking of the 50 most powerful Oklahomans, several spots ahead of the governor and both U.S. Senators.

As mayor, Holt has repeatedly drawn attention to communities that had not felt incorporated into Oklahoma City's decision-making in the past. He proclaimed "Indigenous Peoples' Day" for the first time in city history, proclaimed "Pride" for the first time in city history to honor the LGBTQ community, stated publicly that immigrants are welcome in Oklahoma City  and has championed the African American community on numerous fronts, including being the first mayor to join official celebrations commemorating the city's civil rights movement, and the inclusion of a $25 million civil rights center in his MAPS 4 initiative. Holt also championed the addition of a diversity and inclusion officer to the city staff.

In 2019, Holt was featured in Men's Health magazine as the "hoop-shooting mayor" of Oklahoma City. The same year, he brought actor Jesse Eisenberg to an Oklahoma City Thunder game as his guest. In September 2019, Holt and Los Angeles Mayor Eric Garcetti presided over the coin toss at a football game between the University of Oklahoma and UCLA. In April 2019, he opened a new skate park in Oklahoma City with Tony Hawk.

Also in 2019, Holt created a live music series broadcast from his office called "City Hall Sessions". It mostly featured local artists, but in 2020 the Indigo Girls performed.

In 2019, Holt created a task force to create new policies to address homelessness in Oklahoma City.

In 2019, Holt joined leaders of five other cities in signing an agreement to form Oklahoma's first Regional Transit Authority (RTA), with plans to build a metropolitan rail system in the years ahead.

During the COVID-19 pandemic, Holt proclaimed a state of emergency on the first day a local case was identified in March 2020, put Oklahoma City into "shelter in place", and was continuously aggressive in addressing the pandemic. When Oklahoma City experienced a second peak in the summer of 2020, Holt supported a mask ordinance that was credited with bringing the numbers back down. Eleven months into the pandemic, Oklahoma City had a death rate lower than all but six other large cities, and 27% lower than the rest of Oklahoma. 
 
During the 2020 protests following the murder of George Floyd in Minneapolis, Holt went twice to protests and listened to Black Lives Matter leaders and protesters in front of the Oklahoma City police headquarters. He met with Black Lives Matter leaders and created a task force to look at law enforcement policies and a task force to look at reinstatement of the city's Human Rights Commission. The Oklahoman editorialized that Holt's "leadership has been on display amid the fallout from the death of George Floyd in Minneapolis." The OKC Friday newspaper wrote that Holt's "understanding attitude of the BLM problems and moves to rectify them has kept Oklahoma City one of the calmest cities in the nation."

Throughout his term in office, Holt has read to kindergarten classes at public elementary schools in the city every Friday.

In 2020, Holt appeared on Diners, Drive-Ins and Dives in a segment with Guy Fieri. In June 2020, he appeared in a performance by The Flaming Lips on The Late Show with Stephen Colbert.

In September 2020, Oprah Winfrey interviewed Holt on her "Oprah's Book Club" podcast and television episodes devoted to Caste by Isabel Wilkerson.

On April 19, 2020, the 25th anniversary of the Oklahoma City bombing, Holt said at the ceremony, "this sacred place is a sober reminder that humanity is in fact capable of such evil things, even here in the United States, even here in Oklahoma, and that we all have an obligation to speak up, and to reject words of dehumanization, words that divide us, words that cast others as our enemy. Right now, I hear such words coming out of the mouths of some of the most prominent people in our country, and I see them echoed in daily life by those who know better. We should know how this story ends, but let this place be a reminder. We must have better conversations, we must reject dehumanization, we must love one another."

In January 2021, Holt announced the completion of one of the largest job-creation initiatives in city history, securing 1,500 new higher-paying back-office jobs at Costco.

In March 2021, Holt cut the ribbon on the largest MAPS project in city history, a $288 million convention center.

In May 2021, Holt authored and passed legislation to repeal 85% of Oklahoma City's occupational licenses.

In 2020 and 2021, Holt championed an initiative to transition the city's former convention center into a large film production facility known as Prairie Surf Media, whose first major production was Tulsa King.

Amid speculation in 2021 that Holt may run for governor of Oklahoma, one columnist wrote: "[Holt] is that rarest of things in Oklahoma politics: a moderate, a man who believes in science and democracy and the American way and telling the truth, even when it's unpopular and uncomfortable."

In June 2021, a publicly released poll of Oklahoma City voters found that Holt was favored by Republicans 54%-19% and by Democrats 61%-12%. The pollster wrote, "In today's political environment, it is very unusual to see a candidate who is able to draw such support from members of both parties."

In June 2021, Holt declared "Ed Ruscha Day" during Ruscha's return to his hometown for his first solo exhibit in Oklahoma.

In July 2021, Holt was again named the third-most powerful person in the state in a long-running poll published by the OKC Friday newspaper. The ranking placed him ahead of all the state's non-tribal elected officials.

In 2021, Holt told The Washington Post that the Oklahoma City Bombing provides a cautionary lesson against political extremism. "It's a very simple statement and a very simple lesson", Holt said. "Look at that scar in downtown Oklahoma City and the 168 lives we lost, and recognize that that's where this all leads if you pursue this path of extremism." The Post called Holt the "most visible [Oklahoma] Republican to deliver a full-throated condemnation of right-wing radicalism".

In July 2021, Holt met with President Joe Biden and Vice President Kamala Harris at the White House to discuss the need for an infrastructure package supporting cities.

In the summer of 2021, Holt brought Leonardo DiCaprio to the First Americans Museum, the Oklahoma City National Memorial and the Oklahoma City Museum of Art.

In July 2021, Holt joined other Oklahoma City leaders to announce their support for the expansion of Tinker Air Force Base, Oklahoma City's largest employer.

In August 2021, Holt touted the city's hosting of the SuperCup by the International Canoe Federation, the most significant event yet held at the city's whitewater facilities. The city hosted it again in 2022.

The 2020 Census found that Oklahoma City had jumped from the nation's 31st-largest city in 2010 to its 22nd-largest in 2020, which Holt called "validation."

In September 2021, Holt helped open the new Homeland grocery store in Northeast Oklahoma City, the heart of the city's African American community and a longtime food desert. The project required significant public investment and support from Holt and other city officials.

In September 2021, Holt and airport officials opened the new expansion of Will Rogers World Airport.

In September 2021, Holt and tribal leaders opened the new First Americans Museum, a $175 million facility dedicated to telling the Native American story. Holt spoke at the opening ceremony as the city's first Native American mayor.

In October 2021, Holt surprised the crowd at a local Latino festival with actor Danny Trejo. Later that month, Holt touted the announcement of a $300 million development around the First Americans Museum to be led by the Chickasaw Nation.

In November 2021, Holt touted that the Oklahoma City metropolitan unemployment rate had dropped below 2% for the first time in city history. Later that month, he met with Governor Jack Markell as part of Oklahoma City's Afghanistan refugee resettlement efforts. At the end of the month, Holt announced the completion of a project to better mark Route 66 through Oklahoma City, continuing an effort he had started a decade before.

In December 2021, Holt announced Oklahoma City had worked with Wayne Coyne of The Flaming Lips to publicly display an 18-foot by 18-foot painting he created with Damien Hirst. In January 2022, Holt and the City reached an agreement for a new $177 million development, using $10 million in MAPS 4 funds, in the city's Innovation District.

In March 2022, Holt announced he had worked with civic leaders to design a multi-million-dollar permanent monument commemorating the city's civil rights and sit-in movement.

In April 2022, the final month of his first term, Holt led a delegation of 12 mayors to Israel, where they met with various officials, including the mayors of Tel Aviv and Jerusalem.

Also in April 2022, Holt had dinner with Martha Stewart in Oklahoma City. That same month, Holt helped announce that Oklahoma City had been named the host of the 2026 International Canoe Federation Canoe Slalom World Championships, the first time that event had been held in North America since 2014.

Mayor of Oklahoma City (second term)

Holt was reelected to a second term on February 8, 2022, receiving 59.8% of the vote in four-way, nonpartisan race, 40 points ahead of his nearest competitor. The election featured the largest voter turnout for an Oklahoma City mayoral election since 1959, and Holt received more votes than any candidate for Oklahoma City mayor since 1959. On election night, Holt told supporters: "We are not a red city, or a blue city, or even a purple city. We are Oklahoma City."

Including a candidate who withdrew, Holt's opponents collectively spent approximately $400,000. Holt broke the Oklahoma City mayoral fundraising record, topping $800,000. He was endorsed by the local police and fire unions, as well as 2,000 individuals, including prominent Republicans and Democrats.

Two of the other candidates who made it to Election Day identified themselves publicly as Republicans and one cited Holt's opposition to Trumpism as a primary reason for her candidacy. During the campaign, that candidate, who finished third, publicly called for Islam to be "eradicated."

A week after his reelection, Holt wrote in The Hill that his victory, buoyed by the support of Republicans, Democrats and Independents, exhibited the merits of pluralism: "Oklahoma City’s experiment in and commitment to pluralism" is "well worth replicating locally, statewide, and nationally as an antidote for these divisive times. What’s happening in Oklahoma City may seem novel today, but it actually reflects the qualities that made this country great—pluralism, compromise and pragmatism."

Holt's second term began in May 2022. He asked an Afghan refugee to administer his oath of office, and Sandi Patty performed at the ceremony. Holt also held an interfaith prayer service before his inauguration that included Christian, Jewish and Muslim representation.

In May 2022, Holt began touting Oklahoma City's status as a top-20 U.S. city, the first time the city had ever ranked that high in the census. It had ranked 27th when Holt took office.

In June 2022, Holt gave former Oklahoma City Thunder player Russell Westbrook the Key to the City. Later that month, Holt broke ground on the city's first Bus Rapid Transit line, a 9.5 mile, $28.9 million transit project.

In July 2022, OKC Friday newspaper named Holt the state's second-most powerful person in its long-running annual ranking, his highest ranking to date.

In July 2022, the Oklahoma City Council recreated a Human Rights Commission, which it had lacked since 1996. Adoption resulted from a task force Holt created in the summer of 2020. The new Human Rights Commission passed 5–4, with Holt casting one of the five affirmative votes.

In September 2022, Holt spoke at the White House at the United We Stand Summit and at the Clinton Global Initiative. At CGI, he spoke about his efforts to achieve equitable economic growth in Oklahoma City.

In November 2022, Holt helped lead the charge to pass the largest investment in public education in Oklahoma City history, a nearly $1 billion bond for school infrastructure. The two ballot questions each received over 60% approval from voters.

In January 2023, Holt led the City Council to enact the largest pay increase for police officers in modern Oklahoma City history.

Opposition to Trumpism
Holt has been consistent in his public opposition to Trumpism.

On November 30, 2015, in response to a The Washington Post story about the potential of Republicans endorsing Trump, Holt tweeted, "No one's asking me, but my answer is clear: I will NEVER support Donald Trump for any public office. EVER."

In February 2016, Holt tweeted: "Just by itself, Trump's mockery of the handicapped would mean #NeverTrump for me." The same month, after Trump's victory in New Hampshire, Holt tweeted that Trump was "a crude, unprincipled autocrat."

In March 2016, after Trump threatened "riots" if he wasn't chosen as the Republican nominee, Holt tweeted, "True American patriots don't threaten violence when they don't win elections. This man is a monster."

In April 2016, Holt stated in a live interview on Oklahoma City TV station KOCO, "I will never support Donald Trump. I have a daughter. I have to sleep at night. I mean, he lacks the competence, he lacks the human decency, he lacks the gravitas. He is not presidential material and he scares the [pause] out of me."

In May 2016, after Trump called Senator Elizabeth Warren "Pocahontas", Holt tweeted, "I'm embarrassed to share a country with this man, much less a party." Also in May 2016, after Trump had all but clinched the Republican nomination for president, Holt told local Oklahoma City TV station KFOR: "He's not competent to be president, he's wrong on the issues, he's not a conservative, he lacks human decency, and maybe worst of all, he speaks like he's a dictator. I can never support Donald Trump in good conscience."

That same month, The Oklahoman reported: "State Sen. David Holt, R-Oklahoma City, said there was no way he could support someone he described as incompetent, unprincipled, autocratic and lacking in human decency. 'I mean, I have a daughter. I have to sleep at night. There is no way I could ever cast a vote for Donald Trump for anything under any circumstances,' Holt said."

In October 2016, after Trump was revealed to have bragged about sexual assault, Holt said, "As I've said for months, I have a daughter & couldn't sleep at night if I voted for Trump. This monster deserves any judgment he receives."

In August 2017, after Trump said there were "very fine people" demonstrating in white supremacist rallies, Holt told The New York Times, "The last year and especially the last few days have basically erased 15 years of efforts by Republicans to diversify the party. If I tried to sell young people in general but specifically minority groups on the Republican Party today, I'd expect them to laugh me out of the room. How can you not be concerned when the country's demographics are shifting away from where the Republican Party seems to be shifting now?"

When Trump began calling the media the "enemy of the people", Holt tweeted in June 2018, "For centuries, news providers have played a critical role in our democratic experiment. They are not the enemy of the people, they are the people. The vast majority who provide us the news do so w/ the best of intentions & deserve the appreciation due all public servants."

In November 2018, after Democrats won Oklahoma City's congressional seat, Holt told The New York Times that traditional Republican voters who once supported the party because of a desire for the "free market, low taxes and a limited government" were now being "forced to also accept this misogyny, racism, and cruelty."

In January 2019, Holt told The New York Times in a story about whether the Republican Party should consider nominating someone besides Trump in 2020, "I think it's healthy and appropriate for the party to consider in 2020 whether this is really the path it wants to continue taking."

In July 2019, hours after Trump attacked members of Congress who came from immigrant backgrounds, Holt tweeted that immigrants were welcome in Oklahoma City.

In April 2020, on the 25th anniversary of the Oklahoma City bombing, Holt told The New York Times, "In today's political environment, I hear echoes of the kind of rhetoric that I think inspired the perpetrators of the bombing. I think that we all have an obligation to look at Oklahoma City—to look at that scar we have in our downtown—and remember where this all leads when you call other people your enemy, when you try to foster division and difference."

In June 2020, Politico reported that the Trump campaign chose Tulsa over Oklahoma City for its first rally during the pandemic "because they saw [Tulsa's] local officials as more Trump-friendly."

In September 2020, when asked by Good Morning America about Trump's admission that he wanted to "play down" COVID-19, Holt said, "I define leadership as being transparent and honest with the people whose safety you're entrusted with. And sometimes that honesty involves sharing bad news. But as long as you're providing a path to the other side of that bad news, it's optimistic."

In October 2020, Holt told The New York Times that "the national Republican Party" had "walked away" over the previous four years from "young people, highly educated people, and people of color."

The day before the 2020 presidential election, Holt tweeted: "Vote for decency. Vote for empathy, honesty, competence, thoughtfulness, integrity, compassion, humility, civility, dignity, obligation, inclusion, love, selflessness, service, courage & aspiration. Vote for virtues that will rebuild & reunify our nation."

In January 2021, three days before the 2021 storming of the United States Capitol, Holt wrote in a piece in The Bulwark that Trump did not win the 2020 presidential election and that elected officials bear a duty to tell their constituents the truth about that. Of some members of Congress who were planning to vote against the Electoral College certification, Holt wrote, "What makes it so bad is that the stakes are so high, because we have reached the edge of a cliff where the only way to continue avoiding the truth is to overthrow our system of government." House Republicans who opposed overturning the election results shared Holt's article with one another.

After the events of January 6, 2021, Holt observed that the insurrectionists were following in the footsteps of Timothy McVeigh, perpetrator of the Oklahoma City Bombing. "I certainly see the parallels", he said. "How could anyone in Oklahoma City not watch what was happening January 6 and not feel like it was happening again?"

In August 2022, in support of the Oklahoma Republican Party chair's public rebuttal of allegations that the 2020 presidential election was "stolen" from Trump, Holt said, "The Moon landing happened, Elvis is not alive, and the 2020 election was not stolen."

Personal life 
Holt is married to Rachel Canuso, and they have two children. They attend St. Augustine of Canterbury Episcopal Church.

Holt has served on numerous civic boards in the Oklahoma City area. He was president of the board of Oklahoma Shakespeare in the Park from 2005 to 2008, during which time he led the relocation of the program to downtown Oklahoma City. In 2013, Holt served as co-chair of the Myriad Gardens' 25th-anniversary celebration.

Holt wrote Big League City: Oklahoma City's Rise to the NBA (2012), a nonfiction political and sports book published by Full Circle Press. It details the arrival of major league sports in Oklahoma City, culminating with the 2008 relocation there of the National Basketball Association's Seattle SuperSonics. The franchise was renamed the Oklahoma City Thunder. Holt, who served as chief of staff to Oklahoma City Mayor Mick Cornett during the time, has said that "the arrival of major league sports in Oklahoma City was the most significant positive development in the city's history since the Land Run of 1889."

The book was positively reviewed by Oklahoma media. The Oklahoma Gazette called it a "fascinating historical account." Kelly Ogle of KWTV-DT television noted during his regular "My 2 Cents" segment: "Holt's book is an enjoyable read, and a dandy little primer on the whirlwind ride this dusty old big league city has enjoyed over the last 25 years." Berry Tramel of The Oklahoman wrote, "David Holt tells us how we got here."

In the fall of 2012, the book was adopted by Holt's alma mater, Putnam City North High School, as part of the required curriculum.

Electoral history

In 2014, Holt was reelected to a second term in the Oklahoma Senate without opposition and no election was held.

See also
 List of mayors of the 50 largest cities in the United States

References

External links
 OKC Mayor Campaign website
 City of Oklahoma City web site
 Twitter account
 Facebook account
 Instagram account

|-

1979 births
21st-century American lawyers
21st-century American male writers
21st-century American non-fiction writers
21st-century American politicians
21st-century Native American politicians
2012 United States presidential electors
American male non-fiction writers
George Washington University alumni
Lawyers from Oklahoma City
Living people
Mayors of Oklahoma City
Native American mayors
Osage Nation state legislators in Oklahoma
Oklahoma City University School of Law alumni
Oklahoma lawyers
Republican Party Oklahoma state senators